Hail is a form of frozen precipitation.

Hail may also refer to:

Places
 Ha'il, a city in Saudi Arabia
 Ha'il Region, Saudi Arabia

Arts and entertainment
 Hail (film), a 1970s American film directed by Fred Levinson

Music
 Hail (indie band), an indie/punk band
 Hail! (heavy metal band), a heavy metal supergroup
 Hail (album), a 1988 album by Straitjacket Fits
 "Come and Get Your Love", a 1974 song by Redbone, originally released as a promo track titled "Hail"

Other uses
 Hail (horse), a thoroughbred racehorse
 Highways Agency Information Line, in England

See also
 Hail Mary, a traditional Roman Catholic and Eastern Orthodox prayer calling for the intercession of Mary, the mother of Jesus
 Hails, a surname
 Heil (disambiguation)